The People's Revolutionary Party Incidents were legal cases in which the South Korean government accused individuals of socialist or left inclinations according to the Anti-communism Law in 1965 (the First Incident) and National Security Law in 1975 (the Second Incident).

On December 27, 2005, the appeal to this case was accepted and on January 23, 2007 the District Court of Central Seoul found the defendants not guilty in regards to the accused violations of the Emergency Presidential Acts, National Security Act, preparation and conspiracy of civil war, and the Anti-communism law.

The first incident
The first incident occurred on August 14, 1965. The Korean Central Intelligence Agency (KCIA) claimed Do Ye-jong (도예종, 都禮鐘), Yang Choon-woo (양춘우, 楊春遇), Park Hyun-chae (박현채) and ten other individuals organized the People's Revolutionary Party.  According to the NIS, this was "an organization attempting to overthrow the Republic of Korea according to North Korean programs"  that "tried to recruit more people from various backgrounds to expand the party structure."  Do, Yang and Park and other six were sentenced to six years imprisonment, while the others were sentenced to a year of imprisonment and three years probation.

The second incident
The second incident, also known as the "Committee for Re-establishment of the People's Revolutionary Party (PRP) Incident" (in Korean: 인민혁명당 재건위원회 사건) in South Korea, took place on April 9, 1975. In December 1972, the Park Chung-Hee government launched the "Yushin-system": an anti-constitutional system in favor of Park's autocracy named after the Meiji Restoration of Japan. Also, the abduction of Kim Dae-jung, a leading politician of the opposing party added to the anger of South Korean people caused by the Yushin system. From October 1973, demonstrations against the Park government gained strength.

Meanwhile, on April 3, 1974, President Park announced the existence of an extreme socialist group: the "People's Revolutionary Party", and prohibited all activities related to the party.

As demonstrations increased against the dictatorship of Park Chung-hee, the NIS arrested 1024 individuals without warrant, including Do Yejong on April 25, 1974 under the National Security Law. 253 of them were imprisoned. On April 9, 1975, the Supreme Court of South Korea sentenced to death Do Yejong, Yeo Jeongnam, Kim Yongwon, Lee Subyeong, Ha Jaewan, Seo Dowon, Song Sangjin, and Woo Hongseon. Only 18 hours after the announcement of the death penalty, the government executed the eight individuals:

Revision
In 2002, an investigatory commission found the charges pressed against those individuals were false. Confessions were obtained using methods such as torture and coercion. It is now widely evidenced that such a "People's Revolutionary Party" never existed in reality, and that it was fabricated by the KCIA.

See also
Third Republic of South Korea
Fourth Republic of South Korea
South Korean National Liberation Front Preparation Committee

References
In Seoul, marking a somber anniversary of executions from International Herald Tribune
Executions Still Smart 30 Years After from Chosun Ilbo

1965 in South Korea
1975 in South Korea
Anti-communism in South Korea
Far-right politics in South Korea
Fourth Republic of Korea
History of South Korea
Korean Central Intelligence Agency